Ulruchyi is a rural locality (a station) in Neversky Selsoviet of Skovorodinsky District, Amur Oblast, Russia. The population was 165 as of 2018. There are 2 streets.

Geography 
Ulruchyi is located 36 km southeast of Skovorodino (the district's administrative centre) by road. Kovali is the nearest rural locality.

References 

Rural localities in Skovorodinsky District